Ochla  is a district of the city of Zielona Góra, in western Poland, located in the southern part of the city. It was a separate village until 2014.

Ochla has a population of 1,544.

History
Ochla has existed since 13th century and it came into being at the edge of the forest. Both Polish and the common German name which used to function among the inhabitants of Ochla testify to it, "Lednicza" (Old Polish: "clearing") and "Romisdorf" (there was a couple of variants of the name), respectively.

Historic buildings
 Holy Trinity parish church  – Gothic of the 13th century' built of field stone and turfy ore.
 Palace of the 13th century.
 Manor house of the 17th century.
 In the eastern part of the village there is a railway station of the disused railway of Szprotawa.

Sport
There is a football club in Ochla: LKS Zorza Ochla

References

Neighbourhoods in Poland
Zielona Góra